Pang Ho-san (1916–unknown) was a communist anti-Japanese activist and general of the Democratic People's Republic of Korea.

Biography

Pang was born in North Hamgyong Province in 1916. Immediately after the Mukden Incident, he joined the guerrillas in Mishan County, Heilongjiang Province, the predecessor of the 4th Army of the Northeast Anti-Japanese United Army in China and started an anti-Japanese movement.

After coming to the coast in 1939, he completed the Northeast cadre training class at the Anti-Japanese Military Administration University in 1940. Become a member of the 1st Guide.

In November 1945, under the direction of the Communist Party of China, he moved to the northeast region and worked as a political member of the 1st Zone of the Northeast Korean Volunteer Army, strengthening the army and protecting Koreans in the area of South Manchuria. From 1945 to 1948, he participated in the anti-Kuomintang battles of the Chinese Communist Party.

In July 1949, as the commander of the 166th Division of the People's Liberation Army, the majority of Koreans entered North Korea, leading the unit. The unit was reorganized into the 6th Division and became the first division commander. During the Korean War, he led the 6th Division and crossed the Han River first through the Gimpo Peninsula, occupied the Chungnam and Honam areas, and massacred civilians in the occupied areas through the 6th Division and partisans under his control. Afterwards, the 6th Division was awarded the title of Guards Division for their majors, such as advancing to Jinju and Masan. At that time, General Walker praised "The maneuver of the 6th Division of the North Korean Army was the best maneuver in the Korean War so far." In October 1950, he was appointed as the 5th Corps commander and commanded the battles on the Eastern Front. In June 1956, he was awarded the title of Hero of North Korea.

In August 1958, he appointed as the president of the Army University. In 1959, Yeoman-gym was implicated in the August Incident in which it was painstakingly engaged in anti-party and anti-government activities and was purged.

References

1916 births
Date of birth missing
Year of death unknown
Place of death unknown
Korean independence activists
North Korean generals
Chinese generals
People of the Chinese Civil War
Communist University of the Toilers of the East alumni
People from North Hamgyong